Semecarpus parvifolius is a species of plant in the  family Anacardiaceae. It is endemic to Sri Lanka. The specific epithet was originally spelt parvifolia.

References

Endemic flora of Sri Lanka
parvifolius
Vulnerable plants
Taxonomy articles created by Polbot